The lek (indefinite singular lek, definite plural lekët, indefinite plural lekë; sign: L; code: ALL) is the currency of Albania. Historically, it was subdivided into 100 qintars (singular qindarkë).

History

The lek was introduced as the first Albanian currency in February 1926.

Before then, Albania was a country without a currency, adhering to a gold standard for the fixation of commercial values. Before the First World War the Ottoman Turkish piastre was in full circulation, but following the military occupation of the country by various continental powers the gold franc (Franc Germinal) was adopted as the monetary unit. In 1923 Italian paper circulated at Shkodër, Durrës, Vlorë, and Gjirokastër, and the Greek drachma at Korçë, the values of which varied according to locality and the prevailing rates of exchange as compared with gold.

Etymology
The lek was named after Alexander the Great, whose name is often shortened to Leka in Albanian. Alexander's portrait appeared on the obverse of the 1 lek coin, while the reverse showed him on his horse.

The word qindarkë comes from the Albanian qind, meaning one hundred, or from Arabic qintār ("hundredweight"). The word is thus comparable to centime, cent, Latin centenarius, etc.

Franga
Between 1926 and 1939, the main unit of Albanian currency was the franga ari (English: gold franc) (Fr.A.), worth 5 Lek and divided into 100 qindar ar (gold cent), used in international transactions. This unit was similar in concept to the Belga, a unit worth five Belgian francs.

Coins

First lek
In 1926, bronze coins were introduced in denominations of 5 and 10 qintars, together with nickel  Lek,  Lek and 1 Lek, and silver Fr.A. 1, Fr.A. 2 and Fr.A. 5 . The obverse of the franc coins depicts King Zog. In 1935, bronze 1 and 2 gold cents were issued, equal in value to the 5 and 10 qintars respectively. This coin series depicted distinct neoclassical motifs, said to have been influenced by the Italian king Victor Emmanuel III who was known to have been a coin collector. These coins depict the mint marks "R", "V" or "L", indicating Rome, Vienna or London.

Under the direction of Benito Mussolini, Italy invaded and occupied Albania and issued a new series of coins in 1939 in denominations of Lek 0.20, Lek 0.50, 1 Lek and 2  Lek in stainless steel, and silver 5 Lek, and 10 Lek. Aluminium-bronze Lek 0.05 and Lek 0.10 were introduced in 1940. A fixed exchange with the Italian lira was established at 5:6.25 (1 Lek = Lit.1.25, or Fr.A.1 = Lit.6.25). These coins were issued until 1941 and bear the portrait of Italian King Victor Emmanuel III on the obverse and the Albanian eagle with fasces on the reverse.

In 1947, shortly after the Communist Party took power, older coins were withdrawn from circulation and a new coinage was introduced, consisting of zinc  Lek, 1 Lek, 2 Lek and 5 Lek. These all depicted the socialist national crest. This coinage was again minted in 1957 and used until the currency reform of 1965.

Second lek
In 1965, a confiscatory monetary form was carried out at a rate of 10:1.

Aluminium coins (dated 1964) were introduced in denominations of 5, 10, 20 and 50 qintars and 1 Lek. All coins show the socialist state emblem.

In 1969, a second series of aluminium 5, 10, 20, 50 qintars and 1 Lek coins was released commemorating the 1944 liberation from fascism. The three smallest denominations remained similar in design to the 1964 series but depicted "1944-1969" on the obverse. The 50 qintar and lek coins showed patriotic and military images.

In 1988, a third redesign of aluminium 5, 10, 20, 50 qintars and 1 Lek coins was released. The 50 qindarka and 1 Lek coins were problematically identical in size, weight, and appearance, so aluminium-bronze 1 Lek coins with the inscription "Republika Popullore Socialiste e Shqipërisë" were released later that year for better identification. In 1989, a cupro-nickel 2 Lek coin was introduced.

All three of these coin series remained in circulation during and shortly after the 1991 revolution. On 1 January 1992, those coins lost their legal tender status, effectively making qintars obsolete.

Foreign exchange certificates 
Similar to many other socialist countries, Albania issued foreign exchange certificates, which only circulated in specially designated shops, and their exchange into regular lek banknotes was prohibited.

Third lek
In 1995 and 1996, new coins were introduced in denominations of 1 Lek, 5 Lek, 10 Lek, 20 Lek and 50 Lek, with a bimetallic 100 Lek added in 2000.These coins use the letter e instead of the correct ë, but banknotes are spelt correctly.

Commemorative coins
In 2001, 100 Lek and 200 Lek were issued under the theme of Albania's integration into the EU and 50, 100, and 200 lekë under the 500th anniversary of the Statue of David. In 2002, 50 Lek and 100 Lek were issued for the 90th Anniversary of the Independence of Albania and 20 Lek under the Albanian Antiquity theme. In 2003, 50 lekë was issued in memory of the 100th anniversary of the death of Jeronim De Rada. In 2004, 50 Lek was issued under the Albanian Antiquity theme depicting traditional costumes of Albania and the ancient Dea. In 2005, 50 Lek were issued for the 85th anniversary of the proclamation of Tirana as capital and the theme of traditional costumes of Albania.

Banknotes

First lek
In 1926, the National Bank of Albania (Banka Kombëtare e Shqipnis) introduced notes in denominations of Fr.A. 1, Fr.A. 5, Fr.A. 20 and Fr.A. 100. In 1939, notes were issued in denominations of Fr.A. 5 and Fr.A. 20. These were followed in 1944 with notes for 2 Lek, 5 Lek, 10 Lek, and Fr.A. 100.

In 1945, the People's Bank of Albania (Banka e Shtetit Shqiptar) issued overprints on National Bank notes for 10 Lek, Fr.A. 20 and Fr.A. 100. Regular notes were also issued in 1945 in denominations of 1, Fr.A. 5, Fr.A. 20, Fr.A. 100 and Fr.A. 500. In 1947, the franga-ari was discontinued and the lek was adopted as the main currency unit, with notes issued for 10 Lek, 50 Lek, 100 Lek, 500 Lek and 1000 Lek.

Second lek
In 1965, notes (dated 1964) were introduced by the Banka e Shtetit Shqiptar in denominations of 1 Lek, 3 Lek, 5 Lek, 10 Lek, 25 Lek, 50 Lek and 100 Lek. A second series of notes was issued in 1976 when the country changed its name to the People's Socialist Republic.

1992 series

1997 series
On 11 July 1997, a new series of banknotes dated 1996-97 was introduced.

Notes dated 1996 were printed by De La Rue in the United Kingdom.

The 2000 lek note was introduced in 2008.

2019–2022 series
The Bank of Albania in 2019 unveiled a new series of banknotes, featuring the same themes on both the front and back side of the notes, improved security features, and a change in material for the 200 Lek banknote, now issued as a polymer banknote. This series has also introduced a new denomination, 10,000 Lek, its highest denominated banknote issued for general circulation. The first two denominations issued for this series, the 200 and 5,000 lekë banknote were issued for circulation on 30 September 2019, while with the 1,000 Lek and 10,000 Lek banknotes were released on 30 June 2021. The 2,000 Lek and 500 Lek banknotes are planned for release by 2022. The 10,000 Lek note features Aleksandër Starve Drenova, commonly known as Asdreni, the lyricist of the Albanian national anthem. The reverse features the flag of Albania, a musical score, a music box, and the first two lines of Himni i Flamurit, the Albanian national anthem, which is "Rreth flamurit të përbashkuar, me një dëshirë e një qëllim.

Exchange rates

See also

 Economy of Albania

References

External links
 Albanian Lek: Full detailed Catalog of Banknotes of Albania since 1926
 All Albanian coins and additional information
 Coin Types from Albania Lists, pictures, and values of Albanian coin types
 Albanian Banknotes
 All series of Banknotes, 
 Historical and current banknotes of Albania

 
Currencies introduced in 1926
Lek